Almshouse Green is a hamlet in the Braintree district of Essex, England. It is located between the villages of Wethersfield & Sible Hedingham.

References

External links

Hamlets in Essex
Braintree District